Stallion was an American pop rock group, from Denver, Colorado, U.S. It was a one-hit wonder, and only scored in 1977 with its song "Old Fashioned Boy (You're the One)", which peaked at #37 on the Billboard Hot 100 chart.

A poster for Stallion can be seen on the wall in the music video for Push th' Little Daisies by Ween.

Members
Buddy Stephens - vocals
Danny O'Neil - guitar
Wally Damrick - keyboards
Jorg Gonzalez - bass
Larry Thompson - drums

Discography
Stallion (Casablanca Records, 1977) U.S. #191
Hey Everybody (Casablanca, 1977)
Keyboard Player (right before breakup) - Randy Lee Crain -

References

Musical groups from Denver
Musical quintets
Rock music groups from Colorado